Events from the year 1747 in Canada.

Incumbents
French Monarch: Louis XV
British and Irish Monarch: George II

Governors
Governor General of New France: Charles de la Boische, Marquis de Beauharnois then Roland-Michel Barrin de La Galissonière
Colonial Governor of Louisiana: Pierre de Rigaud, Marquis de Vaudreuil-Cavagnial
Governor of Nova Scotia: Paul Mascarene
Commodore-Governor of Newfoundland: James Douglas Bt

Events
 Marguerite d'Youville (Born Varennes, France October 1701 Died December 28, 1771) founds the Sisters of Charity or the Grey Nuns of Montreal. 
 At Grand Pre, Nova Scotia, a surprise mid-winter attack is launched about three o'clock on the morning of 11 February 1747 on Col. Arthur Noble's detachment of British troops from Massachusetts, by a French and Indian force under Nicholas Antoine Coulon de Villiers. Noble and about 70 of his men were killed.
 Roland-Michel Barrin de La Galissonière was appointed to be Governor of New France.

Births
 Sir John Thomas Duckworth, a naval officer who became the governor of Newfoundland: February 9, 1747 (England) - Aug 31, 1817.
 Samuel Gale, a surveyor and land agent in Lower Canada (Quebec): born in England Oct 14, 1747.

Deaths
 January 18: Michel Bégon, commissary of the Marine, councillor in the parlement of Metz, France, inspector general of the Marine, intendant of New France, intendant of Le Havre, of the admiralty of Normandy, and of naval forces (b.1667)
 August 8: Madeleine de Verchères, daughter of François Jarret, a seigneur in New France, and Marie Perrot (b.1678); Madeline (alt spelling) achieved recognition when, as a young girl, she successfully fought off Iroquois attackers and helped to save Fort Vercheres (Quebec).

Historical documents
Louisbourg fell because of French failings that should not be expected to happen again, and peace will likely see it returned to France

"Seems to be a degree of treason" - Trade carried on with impunity from Rhode Island, New York and Philadelphia with New France

From as far away as Philadelphia, Benjamin Franklin fears seeming weakness of British will turn Six Nations and other Indigenous against them

New England troops at Minas defeated but parolled in Winter 1747 by French, whose supporting fleet from France is destroyed in May

Referring to Sable Island cranberries, author calls that fruit "a most exquisitely agreeable acid sauce for all roast meats"

Thousands of caribou cross Hayes River, though they have been scarce because Indigenous people kill females before their calves are born

"Both Factory Servants and Indians" hunt geese in "Goose Moon" (new moon nearest March 25) in swamps along Hudson Bay

"The Indians do not express so much Art in any thing, as they do in the Make of these Canoes[, and] are very dexterous in the Use"

Beliefs held by Hudson Bay region Indigenous people, including those that lead them to attack Inuit and other peoples

"The Flesh of the Buffalo tasted of Musk" - Northwest Passage seekers shoot muskox bull, and ill crewmen feel better after eating it

Intendant Hocquart donates building materials for new Tadoussac church, and priest agrees to celebrate mass every St. Anne's Day for him

References

External links

Historic plaque, 1747 attack at Grand Pre

 
Canada
47